Satureja thymbra, commonly known as savory of Crete, whorled savory, pink savory, and Roman hyssop (Arabic: za'atar rumi; za'atar franji), is a perennial-green dwarf shrub of the family Lamiaceae, having strongly scented leaves, endemic to Libya, southeastern Europe from Sardinia to Turkey; Cyprus, Lebanon and Israel (Palestine). The plant is noted for its dark-green leaves which grow on numerous, closely compacted branches, reaching a height of 20–50 cm. The plant bears pink to purple flowers that blossom between March and June.

Habitat
The semi-shrub grows mainly in Mediterranean woodlands and scrubland, adapting well to higher elevations, but also seen on rocky limestone gullies as an undergrowth, and alongside dirt roads. In Israel, the plant is commonly found in the Mount Carmel region, south of Haifa, as well as in the mountainous district of Upper Galilee, in Samaria and in the Judean mountains, thriving in areas where the soils are mainly terra rossa and hard limestone, but also in chalk. The plant is rarely found along the coastal plains, or in the Jordan valley.

Description
The leaves of the aromatic plant Satureja thymbra have numerous glandular trichomes of two morphologically distinct types: glandular hairs and glandular scales. The leaves are opposite, entire and smooth. The flowers grow in whorls, and range from pink to purple. Its fruit pods are schizocarps. Satureja thymbra has a fuscous-brown bark, with many erect young shoots, somewhat tetragonal, gland-dotted and pubescent with short downy white hairs.

Its leaves are sessile, generally extending in condensed clusters of inflorescence, consisting of a pair of sessile cymes arranged around an axis and equally spaced, with numerous lanceolate bracts measuring about 5 mm long and 2 mm wide.

Chemical composition
An analysis of the plant's chemical composition reveals that the Satureja thymbra, of the kind grown in Israel, contains a very high content of the chemicals γ-terpinene (15.9%), and p-cymene (12.4%), with the highest concentration being that of carvacrol (55.2%). Other independent studies revealed the main compounds of the essential oil ranging at varying levels; carvacrol (34.6%), γ-terpinene (22.9%), p-cymene (13.0%) and thymol (12.8%). Air dried aerial parts from S. thymbra collected in Lebanon and which were submitted to steam distillation using a Clevenger-type apparatus to produce the essential oil were also tested. The extracted oil was dried using anhydrous magnesium sulfate and stored at 4 °C. Analysis revealed that the Lebanese Satureja thymbra oil is characterized by high amounts of γ-terpinene (34.08%), carvacrol (23.07%) and thymol (18.82%).

The pesticidal property of the plant's volatile essential oil and other constituents was tested against an adult tick (Hyalomma marginatum), the result being that high concentrations of this oil resulted in the mortality of the tick.

Culinary uses
The crushed leaves of this plant have more of a pungent taste and smell than the true hyssop (eizov), for which reason it is not commonly used today as a spice, except in Lebanon, where it is still used as a herbal tea in Lebanese traditional medicine. In ancient times, whorled savory (Satureja thymbra) was used as a spice in Anatolia and Greece. In Mishnaic times, the whorled savory was called sī'ah in Hebrew, and is often mentioned in rabbinic literature along with eizov (marjoram) and qurnit (white-leaved savory), three herbal plants that grew naturally in the wild. In ancient times in Palestine, water in which whorled savory had been steeped was used to flavor meats that had been skewered and placed over hot coals for roasting. Dioscorides, in the Third Book of his De Materia Medica (3:44–45), alludes to the plant, bringing down its medicinal uses in his day. In ceremonial usage, although it is related to the biblical hyssop, it was considered a different species, thus invalid to be brought in the purification ritual where true hyssop (eizov) was used in the preparation of the sprinkling water to purify those defiled by corpse uncleanness.

Its medicinal use, when concocted into a tea, is said to aid against digestive problems, diarrhea, colic pains, flatulence, intestinal cramps and anorexia. In Israel, the plant Satureja thymbra has protected status, making it a criminal offence to harvest it.

See also
Thymus capitatus (syn. Coridothymus capitatus)

Further reading

References

External links 
 Wild Flowers of Israel. Satureja thymbra 

Flora of Turkey
Flora of Israel
Flora of Lebanon
Flora of Palestine (region)
Lamiaceae
Herbs
Flora of Europe
Flora of Asia
Shrubs
Medicinal plants of Asia
Taxa named by Carl Linnaeus